Stefano Locatelli (born 26 February 1989 in Bergamo) is an Italian former racing cyclist.

Major results
2009
1st Gran Premio Palio del Recioto
2nd Cronoscalata Gardone Val Trompia-Prati di Caregno
2010
2nd GP Capodarco
5th Overall Girobio
2012
6th Overall Tour de Langkawi
6th GP Industria e Commercio Artigianato Carnaghese
2013
9th Overall Giro del Trentino

Grand Tour general classification results timeline

References

External links

1989 births
Living people
Italian male cyclists
Cyclists from Bergamo